Guy Middleton Powell (14 December 1906 – 30 July 1973), better known as Guy Middleton, was an English film character actor.

Biography
Guy Middleton was born in Hove, Sussex, and originally worked in the London Stock Exchange, before turning to acting in the 1930s. In his earlier films he often portrayed amiable idiots, scoundrels and rakish bon vivants, but many of his later roles were military officers in the British Army, RAF or Royal Navy. He died in 1973, following a heart attack, aged 66.

Selected filmography

Film

 Jimmy Boy (1935) .... The Count
 Two Hearts in Harmony (1935) .... Mario
 Trust the Navy (1935) .... Lieutenant Richmond
 Under Proof (1936) .... Bruce
 Fame (1936) .... Lester Cordwell
 A Woman Alone (1936) .... Alioshka
 The Gay Adventure (1936) .... Aram
 Take a Chance (1937) .... Richard Carfax
 Keep Fit (1937) .... Hector Kent
 Break the News (1938) .... Englishman
 The Mysterious Mr. Davis (1939) .... Milton
 Goodbye Mr Chips (1939) .... McCulloch (uncredited)
 French Without Tears (1940) .... Brian Curtis
 For Freedom (1940) .... Pierre
 Dangerous Moonlight (1941, also known as Suicide Squadron) .... Shorty
 Talk About Jacqueline (1942) .... Captain Tony Brook
 The Demi-Paradise (1943) .... Dick Christian
 The Halfway House (1944) .... Fortescue
 English Without Tears (1944) .... Captain Standish
 Champagne Charlie (1944) .... Tipsy Swell
 29 Acacia Avenue (1945) .... Gerald Jones
 The Rake's Progress (1945, also known as Notorious Gentleman) .... Fogroy
 The Captive Heart (1946) .... Capt. Jim Grayson
 Night Boat to Dublin (1946) .... Capt. Tony Hunter
 A Man About the House (1947) .... Sir Benjamin "Ben" Dench
 The White Unicorn (1947) .... Fobey
 Snowbound (1948) .... Gilbert Mayne
 One Night with You (1948) .... Matty
 Once Upon a Dream (1949) .... Major Gilbert
 Marry Me! (1949) .... Sir Gordon Blake
 No Place for Jennifer (1950) .... Brian Stewart
 The Happiest Days of Your Life (1950) .... Victor Hyde-Brown
 The Third Visitor (1951) .... Inspector Mallory
 Laughter in Paradise (1951) .... Simon Russell
 Young Wives' Tale (1951) .... Victor Manifold
 Never Look Back (1952) .... Guy Ransome
 The Fake (1953) .... Smith
 Albert R.N. (1953, also known as Break to Freedom) .... Bongo
 Front Page Story (1954) .... Gentle
 Conflict of Wings (1954) .... Adjutant
 Malaga (1954) .... Soames Howard
 The Belles of St. Trinian's (1954) .... Eric Rowbottom-Smith
 The Sea Shall Not Have Them (1954) .... Squadron Leader Scott
 The Harassed Hero (1954) .... Murray Selwyn
 Break in the Circle (1955) .... Maj. Hobart
 Make Me an Offer (1955) .... Armstrong
 Gentlemen Marry Brunettes (1955) .... Earl of Wickenware
 A Yank in Ermine (1955) .... Bertram Maltravers
 Now and Forever (1956) .... Hector
 Doctor at Large (1957) .... Major Porter
 Let's Be Happy (1957) .... Mr. Fielding
 Passionate Summer (1958) .... Duffield
 Escort for Hire (1960) .... Arthur Vickers
 Waltz of the Toreadors (1962) .... Drunken Fox Hunter (uncredited)
 The Fur Collar (1962) .... Resident
 What Every Woman Wants (1962) .... George Barker
 The Mini-Affair (1967) .... Colonel Highwater
 Oh! What a Lovely War (1969) .... General Sir William Robertson
 The Magic Christian (1969) .... Duke of Mantisbriar (uncredited)
 The Rise and Rise of Michael Rimmer (1970) .... Potter (final film role)

Television appearances
He appeared in a number of television series as a guest character including:
 Hancock's Half Hour (broadcast November 4th., 1957) -  'The Regimental Reunion', episode - Ex-Captain - (series 3, episode 6) - (Riverside Studios, Studio 1, Hammersmith) - (This is one of twenty-four missing Hancock television episodes, (to date).
 Dixon of Dock Green (1959) - Fred Harper
 Doctor Who (1967, Episode: "The Highlanders") - Colonel Attwood

References
 Halliwell's Who's Who in the Movies; 14th ed (2001) editor John Walker - published by Harper-Collins; 
 The Film Encyclopedia by Ephraim Katz, Collins;

External links

1906 births
1973 deaths
English male film actors
English male television actors
People from Hove
20th-century English male actors
People from Moreton-in-Marsh